DemiCon is an annual volunteer-run science fiction, fantasy, and gaming convention held in Des Moines, Iowa, in late April/early May. The convention was first held in 1990.

DemiCon's host organization is the Des Moines Science Fiction and Fantasy Society, Inc. (DMSFFS), a nonprofit group that promotes literacy, science, and the arts, especially through the enjoyment of science fiction and fantasy.

Inception 

DemiCon was founded in 1990 by fans who learned the trade from the likes of Joe Haldeman and graduates of his University of Iowa Writers' Workshop. These fans had formed the Des Moines Science Fiction Society in 1989, and at their first meeting, included a convention among their goals.

The event's name, DemiCon, is derived from the words "Des Moines Convention."

Programming and Activities 

DemiCon's decades of growth have led to a wide variety of programming, but some of the offerings remain consistent from year to year. The following programming is standard fare at each DemiCon:

Opening Ceremonies, including a performance by Trans-Iowa Canal Company
Gaming
Masquerade & Cosplay (a structured and staged costume contest)
Hall Costume contests (informal, no staging)
Art show
Dealers' room
Panels with the Guests of Honor
Presentations by musical guests and professional guests
Consuite
Room parties
Closing Ceremonies

In addition to the staples listed above, DemiCon offers parallel-programming (also known as multiple-track sessions) that can include many diverse topics from Anime to Zombies. DemiCon is a family-friendly event, and offers a wide range of activities with appeal across generations of sci-fi and fantasy fans. A DemiCon member (attendee) might experience:

Music room featuring filking
Gaming competitions with prizes (from board games to electronic games)
Live Action Role Playing (LARP)
Fhannish Film Festival
Venue D (open-mike entertainment)
Discussions of literature, television, movies, media
Panels on science, technology, and the future
Steampunk and alternate history activities
Anime programming and cosplay
Children's programming
Teen Lounge
Presentations pertaining to a wide variety of hobbies and activities, such as:
needlework show-and-tell
home-brew tasting and judging
belly dancing
defending the world against zombies
Demonstrations of costume and prop construction
Iowa's Writers Forum
Live theatrical performances, such as "TICC After Dark"
Video room
Blood drive
Scavenger hunt

Venues 

DemiCon has always made its home in the metro area of Des Moines, Iowa, USA.

DemiCon 1 through DemiCon 7 in 1990 to 1996 were held at the Howard Johnson (which is now the Holiday Inn Northwest) on Merle Hay Road. This was also the venue for DemiCon 9 in 1998.

The Inn at University was the venue for DemiCon 8 and 10 in 1997 and 1999.

For DemiCon 11 in 2000 through DemiCon 13 in 2002, the location was the University Park Holiday Inn in West Des Moines (which is now Sheraton).

The Hotel Fort Des Moines in the downtown area was the site of DemiCon 14 through 20 in 2003 through 2009.

In 2010, DemiCon 21 returned to its original location at the Holiday Inn Northwest. This is slated to be the convention's site through DemiCon 35 in 2024.

Guests of Honor and Themes 

The following table lists the annual themes, and the guests that have honored DemiCon since the event was founded.

References

External links 
DemiCon home page
DemiCon group on FaceBook
DemiCon page on FaceBook
DemiCon on Twitter
Des Moines Science Fiction & Fantasy Society, Inc. (DMSFFS) home page
DMSFFS group on FaceBook
DMSFFS page on FaceBook
DMSFFS on Twitter
DemiCon Archives
James L. “Rusty” Hevelin Collection in the University of Iowa Special Collections & University Archives
Blog entry about the DemiCon experience of Patty Briggs, Author Guest of Honor for DemiCon 23.  See May 10, 2012: "DemiCon and Dear Author."
Blog entry about DemiCon from writer/filmmaker Stephen Zimmer

See also 
Rusty Hevelin
Tadao Tomomatsu
Science fiction convention
Science fiction fandom
Fan convention

Festivals in Iowa
Recurring events established in 1990
Science fiction conventions in the United States
Tourist attractions in Des Moines, Iowa